Carlo Favre (born 2 February 1949) is an Italian cross-country skier. He competed at the 1972 Winter Olympics and the 1976 Winter Olympics.

References

External links
 

1949 births
Living people
Italian male cross-country skiers
Olympic cross-country skiers of Italy
Cross-country skiers at the 1972 Winter Olympics
Cross-country skiers at the 1976 Winter Olympics
Sportspeople from Aosta Valley